Khvormiz Rural District is in the Central District of Mehriz County, Yazd province, Iran. At the National Census of 2006, its population was 7,784 in 2,102 households. There were 7,507 inhabitants in 2,180 households at the following census of 2011. At the most recent census of 2016, the population of the rural district was 8,215 in 2,483 households. The largest of its 123 villages was Khvormiz-e Olya, with 2,198 people.

References 

Mehriz County

Rural Districts of Yazd Province

Populated places in Yazd Province

Populated places in Mehriz County